Loleta Dawson Fyan (May 14, 1894 – March 15, 1990) was the first professional librarian for the State of Michigan (1941 to 1961). Long before the invention of the creation of the Internet, she believed that information should be available to all. She was instrumental in the passing of federal support for libraries.

Early life and education
Loleta Irene Dawson was born 14 May 1894 in Clinton, Iowa. Her father, Albert Foster Dawson, was a U.S. Representative from Iowa. Dawson’s political activity may have been an influence on Fyan’s lifelong participation in a variety of organizations, including the American Library Association, the Michigan Library Association, the League of Women Voters and the Michigan Rural-Urban Women’s Conference.  Because of her father's position, she was able to meet Presidents Theodore Roosevelt and William Howard Taft. Fyan's mother was Phoebe R. (DeGroat) Dawson, whose family came to Iowa via New York and the Erie Canal.

She married Clarence E. Fyan on July 17, 1926. Fyan became a teacher after her graduation in 1915 from Wellesley College with a B.A. in botany and music.

Career
In 1916 she began what became her lifelong passion in Davenport, Iowa, delivering books from the main public library to nearby schools and farms for people who would not otherwise be able to access reading materials. "Books are dead until they meet the human mind,” Fyan believed and so she created the first “bookmobile,” providing service in 1921 with a $10,000 budget and a Ford.

For twenty years, Fyan was head of the Wayne County Library, Michigan. Under her leadership it blossomed into a staff of one hundred librarians, a fleet of cars and several library branches. This was in direct contrast to the prevailing wisdom of previous years that libraries weren't really necessary, and money spent on them was better spent elsewhere.

“Don’t listen to those people who say that democracy won’t work.”, she stated in a Library Journal article. “Of course it won’t work. It’s up to us to work it”.

1951 fire
Fyan was unfortunate in having to oversee the effects of a major fire in 1951 that resulted in the loss of thousands of documents due to fire and water damage in the State Office Building in February 1951.  This event encouraged builders such as those of the Ecorse Public Library to build the library “completely fireproof.”  This building was among others built with funds directly received as a result of Fyan’s work on outlining post-war projects.

Fyan also encountered difficulties raising funds. “There is never enough money, and painful choices must be made each year” she stated in her Report of the President to the American Library Association (ALA) in January, 1952.  She was instrumental in developing library legislation titled P.A. 106 of 1937 which enabled the Michigan State Library to create the State Aid and Traveling Libraries Division.

Career achievements

Michigan State Librarian, 1941-1961
Davenport Free Public Library, 1916-1919
Detroit Public Library, 1920-1921
Wayne County Librarian, 1921-1938; 1939-1941
Michigan Library Association President, 1934-1935
Michigan Library Association Secretary/Treasurer, 1935-1936; 1941
Michigan Rural Women’s Conference Chair, 1935-1941

Legacy
In her will, Fyan left many legacies: the Loleta Fyan Continuing Education Scholarship Fund, the Loleta Fyan Small & Rural Library Conference, the Fyan Community Leadership Award, and the ALA Loleta D. Fyan Grant all aim to encourage and support smaller libraries supporting rural communities, her lifelong passion.

The State Board in 1961 requested her resignation, the stated reason being that she was too old to hold the job.

References

 

American librarians
American women librarians
1894 births
1990 deaths
People from Wayne County, Michigan
Presidents of the American Library Association
Wellesley College alumni
20th-century American women
20th-century American people